The Zaragoza Birthplace State Historic Park is located  adjacent to Presidio La Bahía in Goliad State Park and Historic Site, Goliad County in the U.S. state of Texas.  An amphitheater and bronze statue of Ignacio Zaragoza are also on the grounds.

General Zaragoza
Ignacio Zaragoza was a hero of the Battle of Puebla, which is commemorated each year by Cinco de Mayo celebrations. On May 5, 1862, General Zaragoza and 600 of his forces repelled 6,500 French forces in the city of Puebla, and prevented a French invasion into Mexico.

The house
Zaragoza was born in Goliad on this site March 24, 1829. In September 1961, the county of Goliad donated  at Zaragoza's birth site, for a memorial in his honor. The Texas Parks and Wildlife Department reconstructed his birth home on the foundation. Architectural plans were drawn up for the Parks Department by Raiford Stripling of San Augustine. Stein Lumber Company of Fredericksburg completed construction December 1974.  The birthplace was opened to the public on the 114th anniversary of Cinco de Mayo, May 5, 1976. The site also includes an amphitheater.

A  bronze statue to commemorate Zaragoza was donated by the people of Puebla, Mexico and unveiled on September 13, 1980. It is located on the grounds of the birthplace in front of the amphitheater.

Facilities, hours, admission
Goliad State Park is open 7 days a week. Entrance fees apply. The Zaragoza house is located outside the park grounds about one mile south of the entrance to Goliad State Park
. Group tours need to be arranged in advance.

The Texas State Park Store gift shop is located on Goliad park grounds.

Goliad Park facilities also contain restrooms, a museum, and a playground.

See also
Museums in the Texas Gulf Coast
National Register of Historic Places listings in Goliad County, Texas

References

External links
Zaragoza Birthplace State Historic Site

History museums in Texas
Protected areas of Goliad County, Texas
Texas state historic sites
Protected areas established in 1976
Museums in Goliad County, Texas
Birthplaces of individual people
1976 establishments in Texas